Yi Gang (born 5 March 1958) is a Chinese economist who currently serves as the Governor of the People's Bank of China since 2018.

Previously, he served as vice governor of the People's Bank of China from 2007 to 2018 and director of the State Administration of Foreign Exchange from 2009 to 2015.

Biography
Yi Gang was born in Beijing, March 5, 1958. He studied at Beijing University, Hamline University in Saint Paul, Minnesota and obtained his Ph.D in Economics from the University of Illinois Urbana–Champaign, with a dissertation on statistical model selection methods. He became an Associate Professor with tenure at Indiana University–Purdue University Indianapolis and then joined the faculty of Peking University as professor, deputy director of the Center for Economics Research, and Ph.D advisor in Economics. He went to the People's Bank of China in 1997 and then successively served as Deputy Secretary-General and Secretary-General of the Monetary Policy Committee, Deputy Director-General and Director-General of the Monetary Policy Department, and Assistant Governor, as well as President of the Operations Office from September 2006 to October 2007. In December 2007, he was appointed Deputy Governor of the People's Bank of China. From 2009, he served as Director of the State Administration of Foreign Exchange (SAFE) until January 12, 2016. On April 18, 2012 Indiana University President Michael A. McRobbie conferred an honorary doctorate of humane letters upon Yi Gang, who served as assistant professor and associate professor of economics at IUPUI from 1986 to 1994.

Yi has published more than 40 articles in Chinese and 20 academic papers in English that have appeared in economics journals such as the Journal of Econometrics, the China Economic Review, and Comparative Economic Studies. Yi is the author of ten books, and he served as a consultant for the Scandinavian Journal of Statistics, the Journal of Econometrics, China Economic Review, Comparative Economic Studies, Economic Theory, Contemporary Policy Issues, and the Journal of Asian Economics. He also serves on the editorial board of the China Economic Review and the Journal of Asian Economics.

In October, 2016, Yi helped represent China at the semi-annual meetings of the IMF and the World Bank in Washington, D.C., including on a panel with Bank of England governor Mark Carney. The meetings came as the yuan was for the first time being included in the IMF’s international basket of currencies known as special drawing rights. Questions about Chinese debt levels, steel production and housing production were among those addressed in the meetings.

In March 2018, Yi was appointed as the Governor of the People's Bank of China. In July 2018, he was named Vice Chair of the Financial Stability and Development Committee.

He is also an adviser to the China Finance 40 Forum (CF40).

References

External links
Harrison, David, "China Wants to Make Currency Policy ‘More Market-Oriented,’ PBOC’s Yi Says" (subscription possibly required), Wall Street Journal, October 7, 2015.

1958 births
Living people
Indiana University–Purdue University Indianapolis faculty
Academic staff of Peking University
University of Illinois alumni
Hamline University alumni
People's Republic of China politicians from Beijing
People's Republic of China economists
Businesspeople from Beijing
Governors of the People's Bank of China
Economists from Beijing
Educators from Beijing